Wilkie may refer to:

People
Wilkie (surname), a surname (and list of people with the name)
Wilkie Bard (1874–1944), American vaudeville and music hall entertainer 
Wilkie Clark (1920–1989), American entrepreneur and civil rights activist
Wilkie Collins (1824–1889), English novelist, playwright, and author of short stories
Wilkie Cooper (1911–2001), British cinematographer 
Wilkie D. Ferguson (1938–2003), American lawyer and judge
Wilkie Rasmussen (born 1958), Cook Islands politician and former Cabinet Minister
Wilkie Wilkinson (1903-2001), British auto mechanic and racing official

Places
Wilkie, Saskatchewan, a town in Canada
Wilkie (electoral district)
Wilkie Airport, an abandoned aerodrome located adjacent to Wilkie, Saskatchewan, Canada
Wilkie, Missouri, a ghost town in the United States
Lake Wilkie, a lake near Tautuku Bay in the Catlins, south of Dunedin, New Zealand

Other uses
Wilkie, a former alpha male chimpanzee in the Kasakela Chimpanzee Community
wilkies, a forward roll in gymnastics

See also